Bakshaganj Union is a union, the smallest administrative body of Bangladesh, located in Nangalkot Upazila, Comilla District, Bangladesh. The total population is 20,038.

References

Unions of Nangalkot Upazila